Nattawut or Natthawut is a masculine Thai given name. Notable people with the given name include:
Nattawut Somkhun, Muay Thai fighter
Nattawut Poonpiriya, Thai director
Nattawut Saikua, Thai politician
Nattawut Suksum, Thai footballer
Nattawut Sombatyotha, Thai footballer
Nattawut Jaroenboot, Thai footballer
Nattawut Saengsri, Thai footballer
Nattawut Munsuwan, Thai footballer
Nuttawut Khamrin, Thai footballer
Nattawut Madyalan, Thai futsal player
Nattawut Innum, Thai long-distance runner
Nattawut Chootiwat, Thai footballer
Nattawut Pimpa, Thai gymnast
Natthawut Skidjai, Thai actor

Thai masculine given names